Niamat Karim (born May 10, 1985) is an alpine skier and mountaineer from Shimshal valley, Hunza, Pakistan. He is known for mountain climbing, Alpine skiing, and trekking many challenging passes. He has participated in different skiing competitions, and served as a climbing instructor for the Shimshal Mountaineering School.

Passes 
Karim has trekked different challenging passes, including, the following: Khurdopin Pass; Verjerav Pass; Braldu Lupkela; Tillman Pass; Sherlik Pass; Hisper Biafo Pass; Simla Pass; Skamla Pass; Maidhur Pass; Wakhan Corridor; Wartum Pass; and Chafchingol Pass. He trekked Khurdopin Pass in 2018, considered the world's most challenging pass, Verjerav pass in 2020, Braldu Lupkela five times (which includes one time in winter in 2017), and he trekked Chafchingol Pass nine times.

Mountain climbing and skiing 
Karim has climbed multiple 5,000 m and 6,000 m peaks including Mingligh Sar, Sonia Peak, Qool Peak, Chashkin, Sher Peak, Musa ka Musallah, Goz Khun Sar and Quz Sar Peak. He has summited Minglig Sar Peak 24 times in summer and one time in winter. He also attempted Passu Peak in 2014. In 2016, he and his brother summited Sher Peak and skied the descent. He has also skied from Quz Sar Peak and Qool Peak.

References 

Pakistani male alpine skiers
Pakistani mountain climbers
1985 births
Living people